Craterocephalus is a genus of small and slender brackish or freshwater silversides from Australia and New Guinea. It is the most diverse genus in the family Atherinidae, containing 25 of the 71 species.

Species
The currently recognized species in this genus are:
 Craterocephalus amniculus Crowley & Ivantsoff, 1990 (Darling River hardyhead)
 Craterocephalus capreoli Rendahl (de), 1922 (Rendahl's hardyhead)
 Craterocephalus centralis Crowley & Ivantsoff, 1990 (Finke River hardyhead)
 Craterocephalus cuneiceps Whitley, 1944 (Murchison River hardyhead)
 Craterocephalus dalhousiensis Ivantsoff & Glover, 1974 (Dalhousie hardyhead)
 Craterocephalus eyresii (Steindachner, 1883) (Lake Eyre hardyhead)
 Craterocephalus fistularis Crowley, Ivantsoff & G. R. Allen, 1995
 Craterocephalus fluviatilis McCulloch, 1912 (Murray hardyhead)
 Craterocephalus fulvus Ivantsoff, Crowley & Allen, 1987 (Unspecked hardyhead) 
 Craterocephalus gloveri Crowley & Ivantsoff, 1990 (Glover's hardyhead)
 Craterocephalus helenae Ivantsoff, Crowley & G. R. Allen, 1987 (Drysdale hardyhead)
 Craterocephalus honoriae (J. D. Ogilby, 1912) (estuarine hardyhead)
 Craterocephalus kailolae Ivantsoff, Crowley & G. R. Allen, 1987 (Kailola's hardyhead)
 Craterocephalus lacustris Trewavas, 1940 (Kutubu hardyhead)
 Craterocephalus laisapi Larson, Ivantsoff & Crowley, 2005
 Craterocephalus lentiginosus Ivantsoff, Crowley & G. R. Allen, 1987 (Prince Regent hardyhead)
 Craterocephalus marianae Ivantsoff, Crowley & G. R. Allen, 1987 (Magela hardyhead)
 Craterocephalus marjoriae Whitley, 1948 (Marjorie's hardyhead)
 Craterocephalus mugiloides (McCulloch, 1912) (spotted hardyhead)
 Craterocephalus munroi Crowley & Ivantsoff, 1988 (Munro's hardyhead)
 Craterocephalus nouhuysi (M. C. W. Weber, 1910)  (mountain hardyhead)
 Craterocephalus pauciradiatus (Günther, 1861) (few-ray hardyhead)
 Craterocephalus pimatuae Crowley, Ivantsoff & G. R. Allen, 1991 (Pima hardyhead)
 Craterocephalus randi Nichols & Raven, 1934 (Kubuna hardyhead)
 Craterocephalus stercusmuscarum (Günther, 1867)
 Craterocephalus stramineus (Whitley, 1950) (blackmast or strawman)

References 

 
Craterocephalinae
Taxa named by Allan Riverstone McCulloch
Freshwater fish genera
Taxonomy articles created by Polbot